Beinart may refer to:

Haim Beinart (1917–2010) Israeli historian and educator
Peter Beinart (born 1971), American political pundit
William Beinart (fl. 2000s), South African historian

See also
Beinhart (disambiguation)